Brooklyn Kings may refer to:

Brooklyn Kings (rugby league), American semi professional rugby league team
Brooklyn Kings (basketball), American defunct basketball franchise